181st Street is a major thoroughfare in New York City.

181st Street may also refer to:
 181st Street (IND Eighth Avenue Line)
 181st Street (IRT Broadway – Seventh Avenue Line)